Sun Chengzong (1563–1638) was a Grand Secretary of the late Ming dynasty. He was also made Minister of War in 1629.

Notes

References 

Ming dynasty politicians
1563 births
1638 deaths
Grand Secretaries of the Ming dynasty